Amélie Mauresmo was the defending champion, but withdrew from the tournament due to injury.

Nadia Petrova won her maiden WTA tour title, defeating Patty Schnyder in the final 4–6, 6–3, 6–1.

This was the final tournament in which Grand Slam champion and former world No. 2 Conchita Martínez participated in singles, before her retirement in 2006. She retired in the second round against Daniela Hantuchová.

Seeds
The top three seeds who played, and the ninth seed, received a bye into the second round.

Draw

Finals

Top half

Bottom half

Qualifying

Seeds

Qualifiers

Lucky losers

Draw

First qualifier

Second qualifier

Third qualifier

Fourth qualifier

References

 Main and Qualifying Draws (ITF)

Generali Ladies Linz - Singles